"Indian Giver" is a song written by Bobby Bloom, Ritchie Cordell, and Bo Gentry. It was first recorded by 1910 Fruitgum Company for their 1969 album, Indian Giver. The song went to #5 on The Billboard Hot 100 in 1969 and was on the charts for 13 weeks. Its B-Side, "Pow Wow", was actually a song called "Bring Back Howdy Doody" deliberately pressed backwards as a way of deterring radio stations from playing the B-Side, which was later recorded by another Buddah bubblegum music group produced by Jerry Kasenetz and Jeffry Katz called Flying Giraffe.

The song went to #1 in Canada and South Africa, and #4 in Australia. It was named the #50 song of 1969 on the Cashbox charts. The song was certified as a gold disc in March 1969.

References

1969 singles
1969 songs
1910 Fruitgum Company songs
Songs written by Ritchie Cordell
Songs written by Bobby Bloom
Ramones songs
Joan Jett songs
Buddah Records singles
Number-one singles in South Africa
RPM Top Singles number-one singles
Songs written by Bo Gentry